Yves Ngue Ngock (born 25 January 1989) is a Cameroonian cyclist.

Palmares

2008
1st Prologue Grand Prix Chantal Biya
2009
1st Prologue Grand Prix Chantal Biya
2011
1st Grand Prix Chantal Biya
1st Stage 1
2012
1st Tour du Cameroun
1st Stage 1 Grand Prix Chantal Biya
2013
1st Grand Prix Chantal Biya
1st Stage 1

References

1989 births
Living people
Cameroonian male cyclists